Ian David Garbutt (born 3 April 1972) is an English professional golfer.

Garbutt was born in Doncaster. He started playing golf at the age of 8, and by the age of 16, he had become a scratch player. He won the English Amateur at the age of 18, defeating Gary Evans in the final.

Garbutt turned professional in 1992, and played on the European and Challenge Tours, sometimes splitting his time between both, until the end of 2008. Having lost his place on the European Tour at the end of the season, he retired from tournament golf early the following year to take up a position with sports management group ISM.

In 1996, Garbutt finished top of the Challenge Tour Rankings, after winning the UAP Grand Final.

Amateur wins
1989 Carris Trophy
1990 English Amateur

Professional wins (1)

Challenge Tour wins (1)

Results in major championships

Note: Garbutt only played in The Open Championship.

"T" = tied

Team appearances
Amateur
European Boys' Team Championship (representing England): 1989, 1990
Jacques Léglise Trophy (representing Great Britain & Ireland): 1989 (winners)
St Andrews Trophy (representing Great Britain & Ireland): 1992 (winners)
European Amateur Team Championship (representing England): 1991 (winners), 1993
European Youths' Team Championship (representing England): 1992,

References

External links

English male golfers
European Tour golfers
1972 births
Living people